Textile is an umbrella term that includes various fiber-based materials, including fibers, yarns, filaments, threads, different fabric types, etc. At first, the word "textiles" only referred to woven fabrics. However, weaving is not the only manufacturing method, and many other methods were later developed to form textile structures based on their intended use. Knitting and non-woven are other popular types of fabric manufacturing. In the contemporary world, textiles satisfy the material needs for versatile applications, from simple daily clothing to bulletproof jackets, spacesuits, and doctor's gowns.

Textiles are divided into two groups: consumer textiles for domestic purposes and technical textiles. In consumer textiles, aesthetics and comfort are the most important factors, while in technical textiles, functional properties are the priority.

Geotextiles, industrial textiles, medical textiles, and many other areas are examples of technical textiles, whereas clothing and furnishings are examples of consumer textiles. Each component of a textile product, including fiber, yarn, fabric, processing, and finishing, affects the final product. Components may vary among various textile products as they are selected based on their fitness for purpose.

Fiber is the smallest component of a fabric; fibers are typically spun into yarn, and yarns are used to manufacture fabrics. Fiber has a hair-like appearance and a higher length-to-width ratio. The sources of fibers may be natural, synthetic, or both. The techniques of felting and bonding directly transform fibers into fabric. In other cases, yarns are manipulated with different fabric manufacturing systems to produce various fabric constructions. The fibers are twisted or laid out to make a long, continuous strand of yarn. Yarns are then used to make different kinds of fabric by weaving, knitting, crocheting, knotting, tatting, or braiding. After manufacturing, textile materials are processed and finished to add value, such as aesthetics, physical characteristics, and increased usefulness. The manufacturing of textiles is the oldest industrial art. Dyeing, printing, and embroidery are all different decorative arts applied to textile materials.

Etymology

Textile 
Originally applied to woven fabrics, the term "textiles" is now used to encompass a diverse range of materials, including fibers, yarns, and fabrics, as well as other related items.

Fabric 
A "fabric" is defined as any thin, flexible material made from yarn, directly from fibers, polymeric film, foam, or any combination of these techniques. Fabric has a broader application than cloth. Fabric is synonymous with cloth, material, goods, or piece goods. The word 'fabric' also derives from Latin, with roots in the Proto-Indo-European language. Stemming most recently from the Middle French , or "building," and earlier from the Latin  ('workshop; an art, trade; a skillful production, structure, fabric'), the noun  stems from the Latin " artisan who works in hard materials', which itself is derived from the Proto-Indo-European dhabh-, meaning 'to fit together'.

Cloth 

Cloth is a flexible substance typically created through the processes of weaving, felting, or knitting using natural or synthetic materials. The word 'cloth' derives from the Old English , meaning "a cloth, woven, or felted material to wrap around one's body', from the Proto-Germanic , similar to the Old Frisian , the Middle Dutch , the Middle High German  and the German , all meaning 'garment'.

It is worth noting that although cloth is a type of fabric, not all fabrics can be classified as cloth due to differences in their manufacturing processes, physical properties, and intended uses. Materials that are woven, knitted, tufted, or knotted from yarns are referred to as cloth, while wallpaper, plastic upholstery products, carpets, and nonwoven materials are examples of fabrics.

History 

Textiles themselves are too fragile to survive across millennia; the tools used for spinning and weaving make up most prehistoric evidence for textile work. The earliest tool for spinning was the spindle to which a whorl was eventually added. The weight of the whorl improved the thickness and twist of spun thread. Later the spinning wheel was invented. Historians are unsure where; some say China and others India.

The precursor of today's textiles includes leaves, barks, fur pelts, and felted cloths.

The Banton Burial Cloth, the oldest existing example of warp ikat in Southeast Asia, is displayed at the National Museum of the Philippines. The cloth was most likely made by the native Asian people of the northwest Romblon.
The first clothes, worn at least 70,000 years ago and perhaps much earlier, were probably made of animal skins and helped protect early humans from the elements. At some point, people learned to weave plant fibers into textiles.
The discovery of dyed flax fibers in a cave in the Republic of Georgia dated to 34,000 BCE suggests that textile-like materials were made as early as the Paleolithic era.

The speed and scale of textile production have been altered almost beyond recognition by industrialization and the introduction of modern manufacturing techniques.

Textile industry 
The textile industry grew out of art and craft and was kept going by guilds.  In the 18th and 19th centuries, during the industrial revolution, it became increasingly mechanized. In 1765, when a machine for spinning wool or cotton called the spinning jenny was invented in the United Kingdom, textile production became the first economic activity to be industrialised. In the 20th century, science and technology were driving forces.

Naming 

Most textiles were called by their generic names, their place of origin, or were put into groups based loosely on manufacturing techniques, characteristics, and on their designs. Nylon, Olefin, Acrylic are all generic names for some synthetic fibers.

Related terms 
The related words "fabric" and "cloth" and "material" are often used in textile assembly trades (such as tailoring and dressmaking) as synonyms for textile. However, there are subtle differences in these terms in specialized usage. A textile is any material made of interlacing fibers, including carpeting and geotextiles, which may not necessarily be used in the production of further goods, such as clothing and upholstery. A fabric is a material made through weaving, knitting, spreading, felting, stitching, crocheting or bonding that may be used in the production of further products, such as clothing and upholstery, thus requiring a further step of the production. Cloth may also be used synonymously with fabric, but often specifically refers to a piece of fabric that has been processed or cut.

 Greige goods: Textiles that are raw and unfinished are referred to as greige goods. After manufacturing, the materials are processed and finished.
 Piece goods: Piece goods were textile materials sold in cut pieces as specified by the buyer. Piece goods were either cut from a fabric roll or made to a specific length, also known as yard goods.

Types 

Textiles are various materials made from fibers and yarns. The term "textile" was originally only used to refer to woven fabrics, but today it covers a broad range of subjects. Textiles are classified at various levels, such as according to fiber origin (natural or synthetic), structure (woven, knitted, nonwoven), finish, etc. However, there are primarily two types of textiles:

Consumer textiles 
Textiles have an assortment of uses, the most common of which are for clothing and for containers such as bags and baskets. In the household, textiles are used in carpeting, upholstered furnishings, window shades, towels, coverings for tables, beds, and other flat surfaces, and in art. Textiles are used in many traditional hand crafts such as sewing, quilting, and embroidery.

Technical textiles 

Textiles produced for industrial purposes, and designed and chosen for technical characteristics beyond their appearance, are commonly referred to as technical textiles. Technical textiles include textile structures for automotive applications, medical textiles (such as implants), geotextile (reinforcement of embankments), agrotextiles (textiles for crop protection), protective clothing (such as clothing resistant to heat and radiation for fire fighter clothing, against molten metals for welders, stab protection, and bullet proof vests).

In the workplace, textiles can be used in industrial and scientific processes such as filtering. Miscellaneous uses include flags, backpacks, tents, nets, cleaning rags, transportation devices such as balloons, kites, sails, and parachutes; textiles are also used to provide strengthening in composite materials such as fibreglass and industrial geotextiles.

Due to the often highly technical and legal requirements of these products, these textiles are typically tested in order to ensure they meet stringent performance requirements. Other forms of technical textiles may be produced to experiment with their scientific qualities and to explore the possible benefits they may have in the future. Threads coated with zinc oxide nanowires, when woven into fabric, have been shown capable of "self-powering nanosystems", using vibrations created by everyday actions like wind or body movements to generate energy.

Significance 
Textiles are all around us. The textile is a component of basic needs like food and shelter. Textiles are everywhere in our lives, from bath towels to space suits. Textiles help humans by comforting, protecting, and extending their lives. Textiles meet our clothing needs, keeping us warm in the winter and cool in the summer. There are several applications for textiles, such as medical textiles, intelligent textiles, and automotive textiles. All of them contribute to the well-being of humans.

Serviceability in textiles 

The term "serviceability" refers to a textile product's ability to meet the needs of consumers. The emphasis is on knowing the target market and matching the needs of the target market to the product's serviceability. Serviceability in textiles or Performance is the ability of textile materials to withstand various conditions, environments, and hazards. Aesthetics, durability, comfort and safety, appearance retention, care, environmental impact, and cost are the serviceability concepts employed in structuring the material.

Components 
Fibers, yarns, fabric construction, and finishes and designing [of garments] are the various components of a textile product. The selection of components varies with the intended use. Henceforth, the fibers, yarns, and fabric manufacturing systems are selected with consideration of the required performance.

Use and applications

Other uses 
Textiles, textile production, and clothing were necessities of life in prehistory, intertwined with the social, economic, and religious systems. Other than clothing, textile crafts produced utilitarian, symbolic, and opulent items. Archaeological artifacts from the Stone Age and the Iron Age in Central Europe are used to examine prehistoric clothing and its role in forming individual and group identities.

Source of knowledge 
Artifacts unearthed in various archaeological excavations informs us about the remains of past human life and their activities. Dyed flax fibers discovered in the Republic of Georgia indicate that textile-like materials were developed during the Paleolithic period. Radiocarbon dates the microscopic fibers to 36,000 years ago, when modern humans migrated from Africa.

Several textile remnants, such as the Inca Empire's textile arts remnants, which embody the Incas' aesthetics and social ideals, serve as a means for disseminating information about numerous civilizations, customs, and cultures.

There are textile museums that display history related to many aspects of textiles. The Textile Museum raises public awareness and appreciation of the artistic merits and cultural significance of the world's textiles on a local, national, and international scale.  Textile Museum in Washington, D.C., was established in 1925.

Narrative art 
The Bayeux Tapestry is a rare example of secular Romanesque art. The art work depicts the Norman Conquest of England in 1066.

Decorative art 
Textiles are also used for decorative art. Appliqué work of pipili is decorative art of Odisha, a state in eastern India, used for umbrellas, wall hangings, lamp sheds, and bags. To make a range of decorative products, colored clothes are sewn in the shapes of animals, birds, flowers, and magnificent walls on a base cloth.

Architextiles 
Architextiles, a combination of the words architecture and textile, are textile-based assemblages. Awnings are a basic type of architectural textile. Mughal Shahi Lal Dera Tent, which was a movable palace, is an example of the architextiles of the Mughal period.

Currency
Textiles had been used as currency as well. In Africa, textiles were used as currency in addition to being used for clothing, headwear, swaddling, tents, sails, bags, sacks, carpets, rugs, curtains, etc.Along the east–west axis in sub-Saharan Africa, cloth strip, which was typically produced in the savannah, was used as a form of currency.

Votive offering 
Textiles were among the objects offered to the gods [votive offering]  in ancient Greece for religious purposes.

Fiber
The smallest component of a fabric is fiber; fibers are typically spun into yarn, and yarns are used to make fabrics. Fibers are very thin and hair-like structures.  The sources of fibers may be natural, synthetic, or both.

Global consumption 
Global fiber production per person has increased from 8.4 kilograms in 1975 to 14.3 kilograms in 2021. After a modest drop due to COVID-19 pandemic in 2020, global fiber output rebounded to 113 million tons in 2021. Global fiber output roughly doubled from 58 million tons in 2000 to 113 million tons in 2021 and is anticipated to reach 149 million tons in 2030.

The demand for synthetic fibers is increasing rapidly. This has numerous causes. Reasons include its low price, the demand-supply imbalance of cotton, and its [Synthetic fibers'] versatility in design and application. Synthetic fibers accounts for 70% of global fiber use, mainly polyester. By 2030, the synthetic fiber market will reach 98.21 billion US dollars. From 2022 to 2030, the market is anticipated to increase by 5.1% per year.

Fiber Sources 
 Natural fibers are obtained from plants, animals and minerals. Since prehistoric times, textiles have been made from natural fibers. Natural fibers are further categorized as cellulosic, protein, and mineral.
 Synthetic or manmade fibers are manufactured with chemical synthesis. 
 Semi-synthetic: A subset of synthetic or manmade fibers is semi-synthetic fiber. Rayon is a classified as a semi-synthetic fiber, made with natural polymers.
Monomers are the building blocks of polymers. Polymers in fibers are of two types: additive or condensation. Natural fibers, such as cotton and wool, have a condensation polymer type, whereas synthetic fibers can have either an additive or a condensation polymer type. For example, acrylic fiber and olefin fibers have additive polymers, and nylon and polyester are condensation polymers.

Types

Fiber properties 
Fiber properties influence textile characteristics such as aesthetics, durability, comfort, and cost.
Fineness is one of the important characteristics of the fibers. They have a greater length-to-width ratio [100 times the diameter]. Fibers need to be strong, cohesive, and flexible. The usefulness of fibers are characterized on the basis of  certain parameters such as strength, flexibility, and length to diameter ratio, and spinnability. Natural fibers are relatively short [staple] in length. Synthetic fibers are produced in longer lengths called filaments. Silk is the only natural fiber that is a filament. The classification of fibers is based on their origin, derivation, and generic types.

Certain properties of synthetic fibers, such as their diameter, cross section, and color, can be altered during production.

Cotton: Cotton has a long history of use in the clothing due to its favorable properties. This fiber is soft, moisture-absorbent, breathable, and is renowned for its long durability.

Blends (blended textiles) 
Fabric or yarn produced with a combination of two or more types of different fibers, or yarns to obtain desired traits. Blending is possible at various stages of textile manufacturing. Final composition is liable for the properties of the resultant product. Natural and synthetic fibers are blended to overcome disadvantage of single fiber properties and to achieve better performance characteristics and aesthetic effects such as devoré, heather effect, cross dyeing and stripes pattern etc. Clothing woven from a blend of cotton and polyester can be more durable and easier to maintain than material woven solely from cotton. Other than sharing functional properties, blending makes the products more economical.

Union or Union fabrics is the 19th century term for blended fabrics. While it is no longer in use. Mixture or mixed cloth is another term used for blended cloths when different types of yarns are used in warp and weft sides.

Blended textiles are not new.
 Mashru was a 16th-century fabric, is one of the earliest forms of "mixed cloth", a material composed of silk and cotton. 
 Siamoise was a 17th-century cotton and linen material.

Composition 
Fiber composition the fiber blend composition of mixtures of the fibers, is an important criterion to analyze the behavior, properties such as functional aspects, and commercial classification of the merchandise.

The most common blend is cotton and polyester. Regular blended fabric is 65% polyester and 35% cotton. It is called a reverse blend if the ratio of cotton predominates—the percentage of the fibers changes with the price and required properties.

Blending adds value to the textiles; it helps in reducing the cost (artificial fibers are less expensive than natural fibers) and adding advantage in properties of the final product. For instance, a small amount of spandex adds stretch to the fabrics. Wool can add warmth.

Uses of different fibers

Natural fibers

Plant

Grass, rush, hemp, and sisal are all used in making rope. In the first two, the entire plant is used for this purpose, while in the last two, only fibers from the plant are used. Coir (coconut fiber) is used in making twine, and also in floormats, doormats, brushes, mattresses, floor tiles, and sacking.
Straw and bamboo are both used to make hats. Straw, a dried form of grass, is also used for stuffing, as is kapok.
Fibers from pulpwood trees, cotton, rice, hemp, and nettle are used in making paper.
Cotton, flax, jute, hemp, modal, banana, bamboo, lotus, eucalyptus, mulberry, and sugarcane are all used in clothing. Piña (pineapple fiber) and ramie are also fibers used in clothing, generally with a blend of other fibers such as cotton. Nettles have also been used to make a fiber and fabric very similar to hemp or flax. The use of milkweed stalk fiber has also been reported, but it tends to be somewhat weaker than other fibers like hemp or flax.
The inner bark of the lacebark tree is a fine netting that has been used to make clothing and accessories as well as utilitarian articles such as rope.
Acetate is used to increase the shininess of certain fabrics such as silks, velvets, and taffetas.
Seaweed is used in the production of textiles: a water-soluble fiber known as alginate is produced and is used as a holding fiber; when the cloth is finished, the alginate is dissolved, leaving an open area.
Rayon is a manufactured fabric derived from plant pulp. Different types of rayon can imitate feel and texture of silk, cotton, wool, or linen.

Fibers from the stalks of plants, such as hemp, flax, and nettles, are also known as 'bast' fibers. Hemp Fiber is yellowish-brown fiber made from the hemp plant. The fiber characteristics are coarser, harsher, strong and lightweight. Hemp fiber is used primary to make twine, rope and cordage.

Animal
Animal textiles are commonly made from hair, fur, skin or silk (in the case of silkworms).

 Wool refers to the hair of the domestic sheep or goat, which is distinguished from other types of animal hair in that the individual strands are coated with scales and tightly crimped, and the wool as a whole is coated with a wax mixture known as lanolin (sometimes called wool grease), which is waterproof and dirtproof. The lanolin and other contaminants are removed from the raw wool before further processing. Woolen refers to a yarn produced from carded, non-parallel fibre, while worsted refers to a finer yarn spun from longer fibers which have been combed to be parallel. 
Other animal textiles which are made from hair or fur are alpaca wool, vicuña wool, llama wool, and camel hair, generally used in the production of coats, jackets, ponchos, blankets, and other warm coverings.
 Cashmere, the hair of the Indian cashmere goat, and mohair, the hair of the North African angora goat, are types of wool known for their softness. Used in the production of sweaters and scarfs.
 Angora refers to the long, thick, soft hair of the angora rabbit. Qiviut is the fine inner wool of the muskox.
 Silk is an animal textile made from the fibres of the cocoon of the Chinese silkworm which is spun into a smooth fabric prized for its softness. There are two main types of the silk: 'mulberry silk' produced by the Bombyx Mori, and 'wild silk' such as Tussah silk (wild silk). Silkworm larvae produce the first type if cultivated in habitats with fresh mulberry leaves for consumption, while Tussah silk is produced by silkworms feeding purely on oak leaves. Around four-fifths of the world's silk production consists of cultivated silk. Silk production consists of pillow covers, dresses, tops, skirts, bed sheets, curtains.

Microbes
Bacterial cellulose can be made from industrial organic and agricultural waste, and used as material for textiles and clothing.

Mineral
 Asbestos and basalt fibre are used for vinyl tiles, sheeting and adhesives, "transite" panels and siding, acoustical ceilings, stage curtains, and fire blankets.
 Glass fibre is used in the production of ironing board and mattress covers, ropes and cables, reinforcement fibre for composite materials, insect netting, flame-retardant and protective fabric, soundproof, fireproof, and insulating fibres. Glass fibres are woven and coated with Teflon to produce beta cloth, a virtually fireproof fabric which replaced nylon in the outer layer of United States space suits since 1968.
 Metal fibre, metal foil, and metal wire have a variety of uses, including the production of cloth-of-gold and jewellery. Hardware cloth (US term only) is a coarse woven mesh of steel wire, used in construction. It is much like standard window screening, but heavier and with a more open weave.

Minerals and natural and synthetic fabrics may be combined, as in emery cloth, a layer of emery abrasive glued to a cloth backing. Also, "sand cloth" is a U.S. term for fine wire mesh with abrasive glued to it, employed like emery cloth or coarse sandpaper.

Synthetic 

In the 20th century, they were supplemented by artificial fibers made from petroleum. Textiles are made in various strengths and degrees of durability, from the finest microfibre made of strands thinner than one denier to the sturdiest canvas.

Synthetic textiles are used primarily in the production of clothing, as well as the manufacture of geotextiles. Synthetic fibers are those that are chemically constructed, therefore are unsustainable.

 Polyester fibre is used in all types of clothing, either alone or blended with fibres such as cotton.
 Aramid fibre (e.g. Twaron) is used for flame-retardant clothing, cut-protection, and armour.
 Acrylic is a fibre used to imitate wools, including cashmere, and is often used in replacement of them.
 Nylon is a fibre used to imitate silk; it is used in the production of pantyhose. Thicker nylon fibres are used in rope and outdoor clothing.
 Spandex (trade name Lycra) is a polyurethane product that can be made tight-fitting without impeding movement. It is used to make activewear, bras, and swimsuits.
 Olefin fibre is a fibre used in activewear, linings, and warm clothing. Olefins are hydrophobic, allowing them to dry quickly. A sintered felt of olefin fibres is sold under the trade name Tyvek.
 Ingeo is a polylactide fibre blended with other fibres such as cotton and used in clothing. It is more hydrophilic than most other synthetics, allowing it to wick away perspiration.
 Lurex is a metallic fibre used in clothing embellishment.
 Milk proteins have also been used to create synthetic fabric. Milk or casein fibre cloth was developed during World War I in Germany, and further developed in Italy and America during the 1930s. Milk fibre fabric is not very durable and wrinkles easily, but has a pH similar to human skin and possesses anti-bacterial properties. It is marketed as a biodegradable, renewable synthetic fibre.
 Carbon fibre is mostly used in composite materials, together with resin, such as carbon fibre reinforced plastic. The fibres are made from polymer fibres through carbonization.

Production methods 

Textile manufacturing has progressed from prehistoric crafts to a fully automated industry. Over the years, there have been continuous improvements in fabric structure and design.  

Important parameters in fabric selection:

The primary consideration in fabric selection is the end use. The fabric needs vary greatly depending on the application. Similar types of fabric may not be suitable for all applications.

Fabric weight is an important criteria while producing different fabrics. A carpet requires a fabric with 1300 GSM, but a robe may be made with 160 GSM. Certainly, fabrics for clothes and carpets have distinct weights.

Stretchable fabrics have greater movability and are thus more comfortable than fabrics with no stretch or less stretch.

Textile exports 

According to the United Nations Commodity Trade Statistics Database, the global textiles and apparel export market reached $772 billion in 2013.

Changing dynamics of the market 
China is the largest exporter of textile goods. The majority of China's exports consist of apparel, apparel accessories, textile yarns, and textile products. The competitive advantages of the China are low prices and abundant labor, lowered commercial obstacles, and a ready supply of raw materials. China, along with the United States and India, is a major producer of cotton.

China's apparel market share has declined in recent years due to various reasons and a shift toward high-end, sophisticated products.  Additionally, the investors from China made stakes in Myanmar, Vietnam, and Cambodia. Last year, its market share was 36.7%, or $161 billion, a decline of 8% year-over-year. In other words, China lost $14 billion in garment work orders to other countries in a single year. In 2016, Bangladesh's apparel market share was valued at $28 billion, increasing 7.69 percent from the previous year.

In 2016 the leading exporters of apparel were; China ($161 billion), Bangladesh ($28 billion), Vietnam ($25 billion), India ($18 billion), Hong Kong ($16 billion), Turkey ($15 billion), and Indonesia ($7 billion).

Garment Exports in Bangladesh Reached Record High in 2021-2022 Fiscal Year; China ($220.302 billion), Bangladesh ($38.70 billion), India ($8.127 billion), Pakistan ($19.33 billion).

Finishing 

The fabric, when it leaves a loom or knitting machine, is not readily usable. It may be rough, uneven, or have flaws like skewing. Hence, it is necessary to finish the fabric. Finishing techniques enhance the value of the treated fabrics. After manufacturing, textiles undergo a range of finishing procedures, including bleaching, dyeing, printing, as well as mechanical and chemical finishing.

Coloration 
Textiles are often dyed, with fabrics available in almost every colour. The dyeing process often requires several dozen gallons of water for each pound of clothing. Coloured designs in textiles can be created by weaving together fibres of different colours (tartan or Uzbek Ikat), adding coloured stitches to finished fabric (embroidery), creating patterns by resist dyeing methods, tying off areas of cloth and dyeing the rest (tie-dyeing), drawing wax designs on cloth and dyeing in between them (batik), or using various printing processes on finished fabric. Woodblock printing, still used in India and elsewhere today, is the oldest of these dating back to at least 220 CE in China. Textiles are also sometimes bleached, making the textile pale or white.

Finishes 
Textile finishing is the process of converting the loomstate or raw goods into a useful product, which can be done mechanically or chemically. Finishing is a broad term that refers to a variety of physical and chemical techniques and treatments that finish one stage of textile production while also preparing for the next. Textile finishing can include aspects like improving surface feel, aesthetical enhancement, and adding advanced chemical finishes. A finish is any process that transforms unfinished products into finished products. This includes mechanical finishing and chemical applications which alter the composition of treated textiles (fiber, yarn or fabric.)

Since the 1990s, with advances in technologies such as permanent press process, finishing agents have been used to strengthen fabrics and make them wrinkle free. More recently, nanomaterials research has led to additional advancements, with companies such as Nano-Tex and NanoHorizons developing permanent treatments based on metallic nanoparticles for making textiles more resistant to things such as water, stains, wrinkles, and pathogens such as bacteria and fungi.

Textiles receive a range of treatments before they reach the end-user. From formaldehyde finishes (to improve crease-resistance) to biocidic finishes and from flame retardants to dyeing of many types of fabric, the possibilities are almost endless. However, many of these finishes may also have detrimental effects on the end user. A number of disperse, acid and reactive dyes, for example, have been shown to be allergenic to sensitive individuals. Further to this, specific dyes within this group have also been shown to induce purpuric contact dermatitis.

, meaning "iron yarn" in English, is a light-reflecting, strong material invented in Germany in the 19th century. It is made by soaking cotton threads in a starch and paraffin wax solution. The threads are then stretched and polished by steel rollers and brushes. The result of the process is a lustrous, tear-resistant yarn which is extremely hardwearing.

Environmental and health impacts 
After the oil industry, the fashion industry is the second biggest polluter of agricultural land, which has several harmful impacts on the environment. As the industry grows, the effect on the environment is worsening. Textile manufacturing is one of the oldest and most technologically complicated industries. This industry's fundamental strength stems from its solid manufacturing base of a diverse range of fibers/yarns ranging from natural fibers such as jute, silk, wool, cotton, and jute, to synthetic or manufactured fibers that include polyester, viscose, nylon, and acrylic. Textile mills and their wastewater have grown in proportion to the increase in demand for textile products, generating a severe pollution concern around the world. Numerous textile industry chemicals pose environmental and health risks. Among the compounds in textile effluent, dyes are considered significant contaminants. Water pollution generated by the discharge of untreated wastewater and the use of toxic chemicals, particularly during processing, account for the majority of the global environmental concerns linked with the textile industry.

Environmental impacts 
Clothing is necessary to meet the fundamental needs of humans. Increased population and living standards have increased the need for clothing, enhancing the demand for textile manufacturing; wet processing needs more water consumption. Conventional machinery and treatment procedures use enormous quantities of water, especially for natural fibers, which require up to 150 kg of water per kg of material.
The textile sector is accountable for a substantial number of environmental impacts. However, the discharge of untreated effluents into water bodies is responsible for the majority of environmental harm produced by the textile sector. The textile sector is believed to utilise 79 trillion litres of water per year and to discharge around 20% of all industrial effluent into the environment. Reportedly, aromatic and heterocyclic compounds with color-display and polar groups make up most of the dyes used in textile coloration processes. The structure is more complex and stable, making it more difficult to degrade printing and dyeing wastewater.

Health impacts 
Many kinds of respiratory diseases, skin problems, and allergies may be caused by dyes and pigments discharged into the water.

Although formaldehyde levels in clothing are unlikely to be at levels high enough to cause an allergic reaction, due to the presence of such a chemical, quality control and testing are of utmost importance. Flame retardants (mainly in the brominated form) are also of concern where the environment, and their potential toxicity, are concerned.

Chemicals use, advantage and health impacts 
Certain chemical finishes contain potential hazards to health and the environment. Perfluorinated acids are considered to be hazardous to human health by the US Environmental Protection Agency.

Testing 
Testing for these additives is possible at a number of commercial laboratories.  It is also possible to have textiles tested according to the Oeko-tex certification standard, which contains limits levels for the use of certain chemicals in textiles products.

Laws and regulations 
Different countries have certain laws and regulations to protect consumers' interests.  The Textile Fiber Products Identification Act is a law that protects consumers in the United States. The act protects producer and consumer interests by implementing labelling (required content disclosure) and advertising requirements on textile products. The Textile Fiber Products Identification Act applies to all textile fiber products besides wool, which is governed by the Wool Product Label Number. The law prohibits misinformation about the fiber content, misbranding, and any unfair advertising practice, as well as requires businesses to operate in a particular manner.

Testing of textiles 
Testing occurs at various stages of the textile manufacturing process, from raw material to finished product. The purpose of testing is to evaluate and analyze the regulatory compliance, the product's quality and performance, as well as to measure its specifications. Textile testing encompasses a wide range of methodologies, procedures, equipment, and sophisticated laboratories. Local governments and authorized organization's such as ASTM International, International Organization for Standardization, and American Association of Textile Chemists and Colorists establish standards for testing of textiles.

Some examples of tests at different stages:

For fiber: Fiber identification is a necessary test for determining fiber content and classifying products. The labelling of items with their fiber content percentage is a regulatory requirement. Using microscopy, solubility, and burn tests, fibers are distinguished from one another. More fiber relating tests include fiber length, diameter, Micronaire.

For yarn: Yarn count, Denier, Strength, evenness.

For fabric: Dimensional stability, color fastness, thread count, G.S.M, pilling, flammability.

Picture gallery

See also 

 Clothing in the ancient world
 International Down and Feather Testing Laboratory
 List of textile fibres
 Technical textile
 Textile arts
 Textile manufacturing (terminology)
 Textile printing
 Timeline of clothing and textiles technology

References

Further reading 
 Boucher, François. 20,000 Years of Fashion: The history of costume and personal adornment. New York: Harry N. Abrams, 1987 .
  Conrad, James L. "'Drive That Branch': Samuel Slater, the Power Loom, and the Writing of America's Textile History". Technology and culture 36.1 (1995): 1–28. online.
 Jenkins, David, ed.: The Cambridge History of Western Textiles, Cambridge, UK: Cambridge University Press, 2003, .
 Payne, Blanche; Winakor, Geitel; Farrell-Beck Jane (1992) The History of Costume, from the Ancient Mesopotamia to the Twentieth Century, 2nd Edn, HarperCollins .
 Piponnier, Françoise, and Perrine Mane; Dress in the Middle Ages; Yale UP; 1997; .
 
  Introduction by Teresa Archuleta-Sagel. 196 pages with 125 black and white as well as colour plates. Fisher is Curator Emirta, Textiles & Costumes of the Museum of International Folk Art.
 
 Arai, Masanao (Textile Industry Research Institute of Gunma). "From Kitsch to Art Moderne: Popular Textiles for Women in the First Half of Twentieth-Century Japan" (Archive). Textile Society of America Symposium Proceedings. Textile Society of America, January 1, 1998.

 
Clothing industry